Zhang Yin may refer to:

Zhang Yin (entrepreneur) (born 1957), Chinese entrepreneur
Zhang Yin (painter) (1761–1829), Chinese painter of the Qing Dynasty